Odense Boldklub (also known as Odense BK or the more commonly used OB) is a Danish professional football club based in the city Odense. The club has won three Danish championships and five Danish Cup trophies. OB play in the Danish Superliga and their home field is Nature Energy Park. OB's clubhouse is located in Ådalen near Odense River.

History

Early history
OB were founded on 12 July 1887 as Odense Cricketklub, with cricket the only sport. In 1889, football and tennis departments were included in the club, and it changed name to the present Odense Boldklub. The club were then located in Munke Mose (The Monks bog) in Odense. OB moved to Ådalen in 1968, where the club still trains today.

In 1916, OB won the province championship for the first time and qualified to the semi-final of the Danish championship. They lost this match 3–9 to later champions B.93 from Copenhagen.

1945–1975: Mixed results
When the Danish championship was reorganized after the Occupation of Denmark during World War II, OB were placed in the third best league, then named the Danish 3rd Division. After good help from the top goalscorers Svend Jørgen Hansen and Jørgen Leschly Sørensen, the club were quickly promoted to the best league. Svend Jørgen Hansen became OB's first Danish national team player in 1942, while Jørgen Leschly Sørensen was sold to the professional Italian team Atalanta in 1949.

In 1951, OB won their first medals, when the club won silver after runaway champions Akademisk Boldklub. Following the early success, it went down hill for the club. OB were relegated to the second-tier Danish 2nd Division in 1955, and the team had a hard time regaining its position in the top of Danish football. Despite promotions to the Danish 1st Division in 1957 and 1966, the club did not succeed to permanently stay in the top-flight until the promotion in 1975.

It did not help that the local rivals from B 1909 and B 1913 stayed in the top of the 1st Division in this period, where B 1909 won the 1959 and 1964 Danish championships. The intense local rivalry culminated in 1973, when 28,000 spectators watched the 2nd Division match between De Stribede and De røde (B 1909) on Odense Stadion. The match is still the spectator record for an OB home game.

In 1974, the club were in their first Danish Cup final, where the team lost 5–2 to Vanløse IF. Per Bartram from OB were awarded the title as Cup Fighter.

1975–1990: The golden years
In 1975, OB was once more promoted to the 1st Division. This time the club had the players to be a top team in the best league under the reign of coach Richard Møller Nielsen. Just two years later, OB won their first Danish championship in the 1977 season. OB's midfielder Allan Hansen was the top goalscorer in the 1st Division and he was awarded as 1977 Danish Player of the Year' award, a double triumph he repeated in 1981.

The championship win meant that OB played their first European matches in 1978. They competed in the 1978 European Cup, where they lost in the first round to Bulgarian side Lokomotiv Sofia.

In 1980, OB won bronze and the Danish championship was won for the second time in 1982. As Ricard Møller Nielsen's OB team were one of the dominating teams in Danish football in this period, B 1909 finished last in the 1982 1st Division, and were relegated to the 2nd Division. This made OB the best team of the Funen region. In 1983 OB took the cup to win their – so far – only The Double (with the 82' championship).

The team's success was built on many talented Danish players, counting 1982 Danish 1st Division Talent of the Year Keld Bordinggaard. The most prolific OB player of the era was goalkeeper Lars Høgh, who was a constant part of the team from 1977 to 1999 as he played a club record of 817 total matches for the first team.

In 1989, the club won the Danish championship again ahead of defending champions Brøndby IF under new manager Roald Poulsen. The profiles of Roald Poulsen's team included, apart from Lars Høgh, the midfielder Ulrik Moseby, the big defender Johnny Hansen, and the young forward Per Pedersen, who became the most expensive OB player sold, when he was bought by English team Blackburn Rovers for £2.3 million in 1997.

1991–: OB in the Superliga

1991 was a special year for OB. They won the Danish Cup final against AaB after two goalless matches, extra time and penalty shootout. As the national arena Idrætsparken were under reconstruction in 1991, the final was played home at Odense Stadion. The cup success was not matched in the league, now known as the Danish Superliga. After the main tournament of the 1991–92 season, OB was relegated to the Qualifying League.

They finished in second place of the 1992 Qualifying League, and OB were back in the Superliga for the 1992–93 season. In that season, the club won silver medals after F.C. Copenhagen and they won their third Danish Cup trophy in 1993.

As the Danish Football Association (DBU) restructured the Superliga before the 1995–96 season, and introduced a league format of 33 games spanning a full year; OB won bronze once more. Even though the team had many profiles and good players, the team lacked stability and in the 1997–98 season, and OB ended last with six season victories to suffer relegation to the second-tier league, the Danish 1st Division.

The club were runaway winners of the 1999 1st Division and subsequently returned to the Superliga for the 1999–2000 season. OB won the 2002 Danish Cup with a 2–1 victory against Copenhagen at Parken Stadium. Since their promotion 1999, OB's best league performance has been second place, occurring in the 2008–09 season. In 2006, OB ended third, its first top-three finish in ten years. Furthermore, the club had fourth-place finishes in 2003, 2004 and 2007.

In the 2006–07 season, OB finished fourth in the league after a close race in the last rounds. Nonetheless, OB won the Danish Cup after defeating Copenhagen 2–1, which gave OB the opportunity to qualify for the UEFA Cup for the second-straight year.

In the 2007–08 season, OB once again ended in fourth, which gave a chance to qualify to the UEFA Cup through the Intertoto Cup. On 19 and 26 July 2008, they played English side Aston Villa in the third round of the Intertoto Cup for the right to play in the second round of the UEFA Cup. OB managed a 2–2 home draw on 19 July, but a 1–0 away defeat on 26 July resulted in a 2–3 aggregate loss to Villa.

OB finished second in the 2008–09 season, which led to a two-game playoff with Genoa for participation in the 2009–10 UEFA Europa League. The first leg away at the Stadio Luigi Ferraris resulted in a 3–1 defeat, and the home game a 1–1 draw. In 2009–10, OB once again finished second in the league. After a fantastic start of the season the club disappointingly did not take the first place, due to a string of lost and drawn games in the spring of 2010. OB were drawn to face Scottish club Motherwell in the fourth qualifying round of the 2010–11 Europa League.

1994–95 "The Miracle in Madrid"
In the 1994–95 UEFA Cup, OB reached beyond the first round in a European tournament for the first time in club history. The team beat several opponents and most famously defeated Real Madrid to reach the quarter-final of the tournament.

In the first round, OB won both the home and away game 3–0 against Estonian Flora Tallinn. In the second round, they drew 1–1 in the away game against Northern Irish club Linfield and won 5–0 at home, including two long-range goals by defender Steen Nedergaard. In the third round, the played German team 1. FC Kaiserslautern, where OB managed a 1–1 draw in Germany and a 0–0 draw at home; OB advanced on the away goals rule.

In the fourth round, the opponent was Real Madrid, which at that time had Danish national team captain Michael Laudrup on the team. The first match was played at a sold-out Odense Stadion, and OB surprisingly scored on a corner kick in the first half. In the second half, Real Madrid quickly scored two goals, but OB managed to come back into the game, when they equalized to 2–2. Shortly before full-time, Real Madrid scored to 2–3, which was the final result of the game.

Due to the away goals rule, OB needed to win with a margin of two goals to advance to the quarter-finals. Ulrik Pedersen scored for a 1–0 lead to OB, and with a good goalkeeping by Lars Høgh, OB kept Real Madrid from scoring. With a goal by Morten Bisgaard shortly before stoppage time, OB achieved the needed 2–0 victory, and advanced to the quarter-final. OB's victory attracted attention in great parts of Europe and in Denmark the event was named "The Miracle in Madrid."

In the quarter-final, OB met Parma. In the first game away in Parma, OB and Lars Høgh almost prevented the Italians from scoring, but Steen Nedergaard committed a penalty which Parma converted and thus won the game 1–0. The second leg in Odense ended a 0–0 draw, which meant the end of OB's European adventure.

Players

Current squad

Youth players in use

Out on loan

Player records

Club captains

Awards

Club officials

 Owner: Odense Sport & Event

Odense Boldklub
 Board chairman:  Niels Thorborg
 Chief executive:  Enrico Augustinus
 Commercial chief:  Jack Jørgensen
 Communication chief:  Rasmus Nejstgaard

Club management
 Football director:  Björn Wesström
 Assistant football director:  Steffen Nielsen
 Chief scout:  Adrian von Heijne
 Head of academy:  Tonny Hermansen
 Academy scout:  Anders Møller Christensen
 Sports administrator:  Bolette Mai Salomonsen
 Material:  Thomas Johansson
 Team leader:  Elhardt Holm

Coaching and medical staff
 Head coach:  Andreas Alm
 Assistant coach:  Søren Krogh
 Assistant coach:  Frank Hjortebjerg
 Goalkeeping coach:  Lars Bjerring
 Physical coach:  Bo Nielsen
 Transition coach:  Nicolas Arvid Hedeman
 Doctor:  Thomas Haller
 Doctor:  Daniel Roosen
 Physioterapist:  Daniel Borgen
 Physioterapist:  Thomas Almestrand
 Masseur:  Mustapha Lamnaouar
 Mental coach:  Kenneth Philipsen

Honours

Danish Football Championship
Winners (3): 1977, 1982, 1989
Runners-up (6): 1950–51, 1983, 1992–93, 2008–09, 2009–10, 2010–11
Danish Cup
Winners (5): 1982–83, 1990–91, 1992–93, 2001–02, 2006–07
Runners-up (2): 1973–74, 2021–22
Danish Super Cup
Runners-up (1): 2002
Provinsmesterskabsturneringen
Winners (1): 1916
Runners-up (2): 1917, 1919
Funen Football Championship
Winners (18) – record: 1904–05, 1905–06, 1906–07, 1908–09, 1911–12, 1914–15, 1915–16, 1916–17, 1917–18, 1918–19, 1924–25, 1928–29, 1936–37, 1940–41, 1960‡, 1963‡, 1974‡, 1975‡
Runners-up (15): 1909–10, 1910–11, 1913–14, 1919–20, 1921–22, 1927–28, 1930–31, 1931–32, 1939–40, 1950–51‡, 1951–52‡, 1953–54‡, 1954–55‡, 1961‡, 1976‡
FBUs Pokalturnering
Winners (5): 1920, 1924, 1948, 1949, 1951
Runners-up (13): 1921, 1922, 1925, 1926, 1929, 1931, 1933, 1937, 1938, 1942, 1946, 1950, 1953
‡: Honour achieved by reserve team

Achievements
50 seasons in the Highest Danish League
16 seasons in the Second Highest Danish League
1 season in Third Highest Danish League

All-Star Team

At the club's 125-year anniversary the fans elected the best OB players of all time. It was called De Største Striber (The Greatest Stripes) and consists of 11 players and a coach. Each month in 2012 the fans voted for their favourite player, and in the end of the year the team was complete. The nominees was selected by Leif Rasmussen (Fyens Stiftstidende), Uffe Pedersen (OB), Anders Rørtoft Madsen (OB), Peter Borberg (author), Jacob Lind (previous chairman of the fanclub).

 Goalkeeper: Lars Høgh
 Right back: Thomas Helveg
 Centre back: Michael Hemmingsen
 Centre back: Allan "Skæg" Nielsen
 Left back: Chris Sørensen
 Right midfielder: Søren Berg
 Centre midfielder: Andrew Tembo
 Centre midfielder: Allan Hansen
 Left midfielder: Preben "Tordenskjold" Knudsen
 Striker: Jørgen Leschly Sørensen
 Striker: Mwape Miti
 Coach: Richard Møller Nielsen

Managerial history

Note: * Temporary manager

Sponsorship

Carlsberg was OB's main sponsor from 2001 to 2017, while hummel has been its kit sponsor since January 2016. Before that, Puma was the kit sponsor from the end of the 1970s to the end of the 1990s, and has been kit sponsor for every three league titles OB has won. When OB signed with Puma in 2008, the board was hoping that the history with Puma could achieve their ambition with two league titles before 2015.

After 16 years with Carlsberg on the front of the shirt, OB changed main sponsor to Royal Unibrew. They signed a contract until 31 May 2023, and the new sponsor on the front of the shirt would become Albani Brewery, owned by Royal Unibrew. This came into force from the summer 2017.

OB in Europe

UEFA club coefficient ranking
, Source: Bert Kassies website

References

External links

Official site (English page; rest of site in Danish)

 
Football clubs in Denmark
Association football clubs established in 1887
1887 establishments in Denmark
Publicly traded sports companies